Donald Ray Testerman (November 7, 1952 – May 8, 2018) was a professional American football player who played in four National Football League (NFL) seasons from 1976-1980 for the Seattle Seahawks and the Miami Dolphins.

NFL Career 
Prior to the NFL, Testerman was on Clemson's football team.

Testerman was drafted by the Miami Dolphins in the tenth round of the 1976 draft. In August 1976, the Dolphins traded Testerman to the Philadelphia Eagles for a future draft pick. He was then traded to the Seahawks in early September. Testerman made his NFL starter debut against the Dallas Cowboys on October 3, 1976.

Testerman sat out the 1979 season due to an injury. He joined the Miami Dolphins for the 1980 season. 

After retiring from the NFL, Testerman was involved in various coaching and non-profit capacities. He periodically substituted for Albemarle High School. 

In 2018, Testerman died from the effects of dementia at the age of 65.

References

1952 births
2018 deaths
American football running backs
Clemson Tigers football players
Miami Dolphins players
Sportspeople from Danville, Virginia
Seattle Seahawks players